Johannes "Hans" Paulus Gillhaus (born 5 November 1963) is a Dutch retired professional footballer who played primarily as a left-sided forward.

During a 16-year professional career, he amassed Eredivisie totals of 348 games and 146 goals, mainly in representation of Den Bosch and PSV, also playing abroad in Scotland, Japan and Finland.

Gillhaus represented the Netherlands at the 1990 World Cup.

Club career

Early years and PSV
Born in Helmond, North Brabant, Gillhaus started playing professionally for FC Den Bosch, making his Eredivisie debuts in 1983–84 (12 games, three goals), then proceeding to score 33 league goals in his last two seasons combined.

In the 1987 summer, A.C. Milan bought Ruud Gullit from PSV Eindhoven for a world-record transfer fee £6,000,000, and that money was soon used in the acquisition of Gillhaus, Wim Kieft and Søren Lerby. The former netted 15 goals in only 26 games in his first season, helping the Philips club to an historic treble – he appeared 105 minutes in the campaign's European Cup final, a 0–0 penalty shootout win against S.L. Benfica.

Aberdeen
With the arrival of Brazilian Romário, Gillhaus found himself relegated to a substitute role at PSV. In November 1989, he signed with Aberdeen for £650,000 and made an immediate impact on his debut, scoring two goals (including an overhead kick) against Dunfermline Athletic in a 3–0 win at East End Park; this was followed in the next fixture by the game's only goal against Rangers, netting through a left-foot curling shot into the top corner at Pittodrie.

While with Aberdeen, Gillhaus collected a Scottish Cup winners medal in 1989–90, scoring twice en route to the final against Celtic and starting in decisive match, another penalty shootout triumph.

Late career
Gillhaus left Aberdeen in early March 1993 after falling out of favour with manager Willie Miller, moving to Vitesse Arnhem for £300,000. He scored a career-best 22 goals in his first full season, as they finished fourth and qualified to the UEFA Cup.

Aged 31, Gillhaus moved abroad again, signing for Gamba Osaka in the Japanese J-League. In 1998, he played in Finland with FF Jaro, and retired at the end of the following season at nearly 36 after helping first club Den Bosch return to the top flight.

International career
Gillhaus made his debut for Netherlands on 28 October 1987, in a UEFA Euro 1988 qualifier against Cyprus in Rotterdam (8–0 win), a game marred by the "bomb incident". In the same competition, on 16 December, he scored his only two goals for the national team in a 3–0 away win against Greece, but was not selected for the squad that competed in the final stages in Germany, eventually winning the tournament.

Gillhaus was picked by manager Leo Beenhakker for the 1990 FIFA World Cup in Italy, appearing in three games (two starts) in an eventual round-of-16 exit.

Post-playing career
Immediately after retiring from playing, Gillhaus returned to PSV and worked there as a scout for six years, after which he joined, in the same capacity, Chelsea. On 23 August 2011, after also six years with the Blues, he was appointed director of football at S.V. Zulte Waregem.

In March 2014, Gillhaus signed for Sunderland, co-ordinating its European scouting network.

Career statistics

Club

International

Honours
PSV
Eredivisie: 1987–88, 1988–89
KNVB Cup: 1987–88, 1988–89
European Cup: 1987–88
European Super Cup runner-up: 1988

Aberdeen
Scottish Cup: 1989–90

Den Bosch
Eerste Divisie: 1998–99

References

External links
Stats at Voetbal International 

1963 births
Living people
Sportspeople from Helmond
Footballers from North Brabant
Dutch footballers
Association football forwards
Eredivisie players
Eerste Divisie players
FC Den Bosch players
PSV Eindhoven players
SBV Vitesse players
AZ Alkmaar players
Scottish Football League players
Aberdeen F.C. players
J1 League players
Gamba Osaka players
Veikkausliiga players
FF Jaro players
Netherlands international footballers
1990 FIFA World Cup players
Scottish Football League representative players
Dutch expatriate footballers
Expatriate footballers in Scotland
Expatriate footballers in Japan
Expatriate footballers in Finland
Dutch expatriate sportspeople in Scotland
Dutch expatriate sportspeople in Japan
Dutch expatriate sportspeople in Finland
Chelsea F.C. non-playing staff